Ewald Banse (born 23 May 1883 in Braunschweig – died 31 October 1953 in Braunschweig) was a German geographer.

Banse was a professor at the technical college in his native city.  Allied propaganda cited Banse's main work, Raum und Volk im Weltkriege ("Space and People in the World War") (1925), as proof of Germany's war lust.  Banse advocated the union of all areas settled by Germans in a Great German Reich extending far beyond the 1914 frontiers.  To achieve this he expressly demanded military action. The warrior was to be the carrier of the coming rule of "Nordic nobility".

References

Christian Zentner, Friedemann Bedürftig (1991). The Encyclopedia of the Third Reich.  Macmillan, New York.

External links
 

1883 births
1953 deaths
Writers from Braunschweig
People from the Duchy of Brunswick
Academic staff of the Technical University of Braunschweig
German geographers
20th-century geographers